Holly Cottage is a building in Luss, Argyll and Bute, Scotland. It is a Category B listed structure dating from the early-to-mid 19th century.

The building, a single-storey cottage located on Pier Road, is constructed of rubble with ashlar margins and dressings. It possesses timber sash and case windows and low sandstone chimney stacks with moulded projecting.

The building is shown on the first-edition Ordnance Survey map, surveyed in 1864. Its construction is similar to the neighbouring Alderdale, and it has similar glazing to South Cottage at Low Aldochlay.

See also
List of listed buildings in Luss

References

External links
View of the building – Google Street View, October 2016

19th-century establishments in Scotland
Listed buildings in Luss, Argyll and Bute
Category B listed buildings in Argyll and Bute